Arthur Charles Hoffman (1884 – January 31, 1920) was an American football coach.  He served as the head football coach at Tulane University for one season in 1913, compiling a record of 3–5.

Hoffman was a 1910 graduate of the University of Chicago where he starred on five conference championship teams in basketball and football. He was a member of 1907–08 basketball team that won the Helms Foundation national championship.

Hoffman was the head football coach and athletic director at Ripon College in Ripon, Wisconsin for one year.

Head coaching record

References

External links
 

1884 births
1920 deaths
American men's basketball players
Chicago Maroons football players
Chicago Maroons men's basketball players
Ripon Red Hawks athletic directors
Ripon Red Hawks football coaches
Tulane Green Wave football coaches